Cherie Piper (born June 29, 1981) is a Canadian former ice hockey player residing in Markham, Ontario. She was a member of the Canadian national women's hockey team and played for the Brampton Thunder of the Canadian Women's Hockey League (CWHL).  Piper has won three Olympic gold medals with the Canadian national team in 2002, 2006 and 2010, as well as one world championship title in 2004.

Playing career
She competed for Canada's Under 22 team from 1999 to 2001. In 1999, she competed for Ontario in the Canada Winter Games. During the 2000–01 NWHL season, Cherie Piper played with the Beatrice Aeros and finished seventh in league scoring with 37 points. Piper was a member of the Under-22 team in 2002 when she was named to the Olympic team for 2002 Salt Lake City Games ahead of veteran Nancy Drolet as part of a move to shake up a Canadian team that had lost eight consecutive games to the United States. It was a decision that shocked other members of the team. She recorded a goal and an assist in her first game of the Olympics, and finished the tournament with five points in five games in helping Canada win the gold medal.

She played four seasons at Dartmouth College between 2002 and 2007, scoring 60 goals and 165 assists in 99 games for the Big Green. She missed the end of the 2003–04 season to play with the Canadian national team at the 2004 Women's World Ice Hockey Championships where she won a gold medal. Piper was named a finalist for the Patty Kazmaier Award in 2005. She led Dartmouth in scoring that season with 60 points.  She won a second Olympic gold medal in 2006 and her 15 points was second to Hayley Wickenheiser (17).

A knee injury in her senior year at Dartmouth forced her off of the national team for over a year and caused her to miss the 2007 World Championships. She rejoined the team in time for the 2008 tournament where she won her second silver medal. She was cut from the 2009 team, but gained a spot on the 2010 Olympic team, winning a third consecutive gold medal.

Other
Piper was also a member of the Canada women's national inline hockey team, winning a gold medal at the 2002 FIRS Inline Hockey World Championships.

Personal
Piper was born June 29, 1981 in Toronto, Ontario, the third child of Alan and Christine Piper.  She has two older brothers, Michael and Stephen, and followed her brothers in taking up the sport. She was educated in the Toronto suburb of Scarborough. Her middle school was Henry Kelsey Senior Public School and her elementary school was Alex Muir Junior Public School. Piper graduated from Albert Campbell Collegiate Institute and majored in sociology at Dartmouth. 

On June 7, 2018, Cherie married long-time beau, Joe Butkevich, in a ceremony at Memorial Gardens in Butkevich's hometown of North Bay, Ontario.

Career statistics

International

Dartmouth

Awards and honours
2004-05 All USCHO.com Second Team
 Patty Kazmaier Award Finalist, 2005

References

1981 births
Living people
Brampton Thunder players
Canadian women's ice hockey forwards
Canadian women's national inline hockey team players
Dartmouth Big Green women's ice hockey players
Ice hockey players at the 2002 Winter Olympics
Ice hockey players at the 2006 Winter Olympics
Ice hockey players at the 2010 Winter Olympics
Medalists at the 2002 Winter Olympics
Medalists at the 2006 Winter Olympics
Medalists at the 2010 Winter Olympics
Mississauga Chiefs players
Olympic gold medalists for Canada
Olympic ice hockey players of Canada
Olympic medalists in ice hockey
Ice hockey people from Toronto